The 2003 Rio de Janeiro motorcycle Grand Prix was the twelfth round of the 2003 MotoGP Championship. It took place on the weekend of 18–20 September 2003 at Autódromo Internacional Nelson Piquet.

The 125cc race marked the first Grand Prix motorcycle racing victory for a young Jorge Lorenzo.

MotoGP classification

250 cc classification

125 cc classification

Championship standings after the race (motoGP)

Below are the standings for the top five riders and constructors after round twelve has concluded.

Riders' Championship standings

Constructors' Championship standings

 Note: Only the top five positions are included for both sets of standings.

References

Rio de Janeiro motorcycle Grand Prix
Rio de Janeiro
Rio de Janeiro Motorcycle Grand Prix